Petrucci is an Italian surname. Notable people with the surname include:

15-19th century
 Alessandro Petrucci (died 1628), Italian Roman Catholic Archbishop of Siena and Bishop of Massa Marittima
 Alfonso Petrucci (c. 1490-1517), Italian Roman Catholic cardinal
 Antonello Petrucci, also known as Antonello d'Aversa (died 1487), Italian Baron and secretary to King Ferdinand I of Naples
 Borghese Petrucci (1512-1516), Italian politician, ruler of Siena
 Domenico Petrucci (died 1598), Italian Roman Catholic Bishop of Bisignano and later Bishop of Strongoli 
 Giovanni Alfonso Petrucci (1650–1688),  Roman Catholic Bishop of Belcastro 
 Ottaviano Petrucci (1466-1539) Italian printer, producer of sheet music
 Pandolfo Petrucci (1452-1512) ruler of Siena
 Pier Matteo Petrucci, C.O. (1636–1701), Italian Roman Catholic cardinal
 Raffaello Petrucci (1472-1522), cardinal, ruler of Siena

20th century
 A. J. Petrucci, American professional wrestler
 Cinzia Petrucci (born 1955) Italian shot putter
 Danilo Petrucci (born 1991) Italian motorcyclist
 Davide Petrucci (born 1991) Italian football (soccer) player
 Gianni Petrucci (born 1945) Italian sports director
 Giovanna Petrucci (born 1998), Brazilian athlete 
 John Petrucci (born 1967) American rock guitarist
 Loretto Petrucci (1929–2016) Italian cyclist
 Luigi Petrucci (born 1956) Italian actor
 Luria Petrucci, American podcaster, see Cali Lewis
 Mario Petrucci (born 1958), English poet, literary translator, educator and broadcaster
 Roxy Petrucci (born 1960) American drummer

Italian-language surnames
Surnames from given names